Aguaray-Guazú River may refer to:

Aguaray-Guazú River (Jejuí Guazú River), Paraguay
Aguaray-Guazú River (Paraguay River), Paraguay